Alexander Patton (March 27, 1791 – February 19, 1857) was the 17th mayor and 19th mayor of Columbus, Ohio.  He was also the 16th person to serve in that office.   He served Columbus four years during non-consecutive terms.  His successor after 1845 was Augustus S. Decker and after 1849 was Lorenzo English.

References

Bibliography

External links

Alexander Patton at Political Graveyard

Mayors of Columbus, Ohio
1791 births
1857 deaths
Burials at Green Lawn Cemetery (Columbus, Ohio)
19th-century American politicians